Great Speckled Bird was a country rock group formed in 1969 by the Canadian musical duo Ian & Sylvia. Ian Tyson sang, played guitar and composed. Sylvia Tyson sang, composed and occasionally played piano. The other founding members were Amos Garrett on guitar and occasional vocals, Ben Keith on steel guitar, Ken Kalmusky on bass and Ricky Marcus on drums. They were named after the song, "The Great Speckled Bird", as recorded by Roy Acuff (1938).

Career
The group was featured in the film Festival Express, a documentary about the music festival of the same name that took place in 1970. The shows were scheduled, and the performers traveled by train, across Canada. In the film, Great Speckled Bird performs "C.C. Rider", along with Delaney Bramlett and members of the Grateful Dead. A performance of the Dylan/Manuel song "Tears of Rage", without the aforementioned accompaniment, is included in the extra features of the DVD release.

In 1970, the group became the house band for the television show Nashville North, produced by the CTV network and filmed at the CFTO-TV studios in Toronto, which, after one season, became the Ian Tyson Show. The show ran until 1975.

The group backed Ian & Sylvia until the duo parted ways in 1975. They also backed Ian Tyson as a solo artist, for his 1973 debut solo album and his live performances, until 1976.

Discography

Albums

Singles

Videography

See also

Country rock
Amos Garrett

References

Bibliography
J. Einarson, I. Tyson, S. Tyson. Four Strong Winds: Ian and Sylvia. 2011. McClelland & Stewart Ltd. . retrieved 2011-09-13.

External links
The Cool Groove – Great Speckled Bird, website of some former members of the band
 
 

Musical groups established in 1969
Musical groups disestablished in 1976
Canadian country rock groups
Musical groups from Toronto
1969 establishments in Ontario
1976 disestablishments in Ontario